Bengt Baron (born 6 March 1962) is a business leader and former backstroke swimmer from Sweden.

Baron won the 100 m backstroke at the 1980 Summer Olympics in Moscow, and was a member of the bronze winning team from Sweden in the 4×100 m freestyle at the 1984 Summer Olympics in Los Angeles, California. An undergraduate student from the University of California, Baron was named into its Hall of Fame in 1999. In the years 1979–1985 he won a total number of 33 Swedish titles.

After his career as swimmer, Baron attended the Haas School of Business at the University of California, Berkeley, where he received his MBA in 1988. Upon graduation, he joined McKinsey & Company in their Stockholm office, after which he joined numerous consumer companies, including Coca-Cola, AB Frionor (a Norwegian frozen seafood company), and Kodak. From 2001 to 2004, Baron was CEO and President of Absolut Vodka, CEO and president of its parent company V&S Group 2004–2008, then CEO for Leaf 2009–2012 and after Leaf's merger with Cloetta he was CEO of the new Cloetta from 2012. He announced in 2015 that he was going to leave Cloetta.

He was previously married to Agneta Mårtensson, the couple has two daughters. He now lives with another woman.

Personal bests

Long course (50 m)

Clubs
 Finspångs SK
 SK Korrugal
 Järfälla SS

References
 Sveriges Olympiska Kommitté
 

1962 births
Living people
Haas School of Business alumni
McKinsey & Company people
Olympic bronze medalists for Sweden
Olympic gold medalists for Sweden
Olympic swimmers of Sweden
Swedish chief executives
Swedish male backstroke swimmers
Swedish male butterfly swimmers
Swimmers at the 1980 Summer Olympics
Swimmers at the 1984 Summer Olympics
Olympic bronze medalists in swimming
Swedish male freestyle swimmers
World Aquatics Championships medalists in swimming
European Aquatics Championships medalists in swimming
Medalists at the 1984 Summer Olympics
Medalists at the 1980 Summer Olympics
Olympic gold medalists in swimming